The Alliance of the Presidential Majority (AMP) is a political alliance formed by supporters of President-elect Joseph Kabila following the 2006 general elections in the Democratic Republic of the Congo. This bloc currently holds the majority of seats in the National Assembly with 332 out of 500 seats.

On 3 October 2018 the Unified Lumumbist Party and its parliamentary allies exited the coalition in anticipation of the 2018 general elections.

Components

|-
!style="background-color:#E9E9E9;text-align:left;vertical-align:top;"|
!style="background-color:#E9E9E9;text-align:left;"|Leader
!style="background-color:#E9E9E9;text-align:right;"|Seats in the National Assembly
|-
|style="text-align:left;"|People's Party for Reconstruction and Democracy (PPRD)||style="text-align:left;"|Joseph Kabila||111
|-
|style="text-align:left;"|Unified Lumumbist Party (PALU)||style="text-align:left;"|Antoine Gizenga||34
|-
|style="text-align:left;"|Social Movement for Renewal (MSR)||style="text-align:left;"|Pierre Lumbi||27
|-
|style="text-align:left;"|Coalition of Congolese Democrats (CODECO)||style="text-align:left;"|Jean-Claude Muyambo||10
|-
|style="text-align:left;"|Union of Mobutuist Democrats (UDEMO)||style="text-align:left;"|Nzanga Mobutu||9
|-
|style="text-align:left;"|Federalist Christian Democracy – Convention of Federalists for Christian Democracy (DCF-COFEDEC)||style="text-align:left;"|Pierre Pay-Pay wa Syakasighe||8
|-
|style="text-align:left;"|Christian Democrat Party (PDC)||style="text-align:left;"|José Endundo||8
|-
|style="text-align:left;"|Union of Federalist Nationalists of Congo (UNAFEC)||style="text-align:left;"| ||7
|-
|style="text-align:left;"|United Congolese Convention (CCU)||style="text-align:left;"| ||4
|-
|style="text-align:left;"|National Alliance Party for Unity (PANU)||style="text-align:left;"|André-Philippe Futa||3
|-
|style="text-align:left;"|Alliance for the Renewal of Congo (ARC)||style="text-align:left;"|Olivier Kamitatu Etsu||2
|-
|style="text-align:left;"|Others||||109
|-
|style="text-align:left;background-color:#E9E9E9"|Total||style="background-color:#E9E9E9"| ||style="background-color:#E9E9E9"|332 out of 500
|-
|}

See also
 Congolese National Convention
 Union for the Nation

References

2006 establishments in the Democratic Republic of the Congo
Political parties established in 2006
Political party alliances in the Democratic Republic of the Congo